Jesús Vidal (born 1975) is a Spanish actor. In 2019 he won Medallas del Círculo de Escritores Cinematográficos and Goya Award in the 33rd edition for Best New Actor for Campeones.

He was born in 1975 in León, Spain with a blindness of 90% and myopia in the right eye. He got a bachelor's degree in Spanish Language and Literature, a master's degree in journalism and he worked on sports section at agencia EFE. He is an amateur in cycling and he is a football fan of Real Sociedad de Fútbol.

In 2018 he played Marín in Campeones, for which he won Best New Actor at 33rd edition. Then he will appear in the documentary film Ni distintos ni diferentes: campeones (2019), directed by Álvaro Longoria and starring Campeones cast. In August 2019 he was cast on Zapeando. On 5 September 2019 he performed on the stage play Alguien voló sobre el nido del cuco at Teatro Calderón in Madrid, and he has written Sala de espera. Poemas y vivencias, with his short tales and poems.

Filmography
 Campeones (2018)
 Ni distintos ni diferentes: campeones (2019)

References

External links

 

1975 births
People from León, Spain
Male actors from Castile and León
Spanish male film actors
Spanish male stage actors
Goya Award winners
Living people
Artists with disabilities